Gopalan PU College is a pre-university college in  Bangalore, Karnataka, India. It is affiliated to Karnataka Pre-University Education Board. It is located in Doddenakundhi 2nd Phase, Brookfield Road on Whitefield

History
Gopalan PU college had its beginning in the Academic Year 2012–13, to offer inclusive Commerce & Science Education.

Streams offered
The College offers courses in the below mentioned Science streams
1. PCMB - Physics, Chemistry, Mathematics, Biology
2. PCMC - Physics, Chemistry, Mathematics, Computer Science

Facilities
1. Laboratories
2. Library
3. Canteen
4. Spacious Play Ground
5. Transport Facility
6. Well-equipped classrooms with audio-visual facility

References

Pre University colleges in Karnataka